The Jin'an Open is a tennis tournament held on outdoor hardcourts in Lu'an, China. It has been held since 2016 and is part of the ITF Men's Circuit and ITF Women's Circuit.

Past finals

Men's singles

Women's singles

Men's doubles

Women's doubles

External links
 ITF search 

ITF Women's World Tennis Tour
ITF World Tennis Tour
Hard court tennis tournaments
Tennis tournaments in China
Recurring sporting events established in 2016